The Botanischer Schulgarten Burg (7.5 hectares) is a botanical garden for students maintained by the municipal Schulbiologiezentrum Hannover organization. It is located at Vinnhorster Weg 2, Hannover, Lower Saxony, Germany, and open weekdays.

The garden was established in 1927 to provide practical botany experiences to students. As of 1974 it became headquarters of the Schulbiologiezentrum Hannover, which also maintains schools in three other locations (Freiluftschule Burg, Zooschule Hannover, Botanischer Schulgarten Linden).

Its grounds contain a range of habitats including ponds, alder and birch groves, deciduous forest, and meadow, in which students can understand scientific and environmental topics. It also contains theme gardens as follows: genetics and evolution, herbs, vegetables, fruit, aromatic plants, geographic garden, sun and energy, small organic experiments, and insects. The garden's perennial nursery (1500 m²) raises plants for school gardens, including a tropical greenhouse (200 m²) cultivating rainforest plants.

See also 
 List of botanical gardens in Germany

References 
 Botanischer Schulgarten Burg 
 Schulbiologiezentrum Hannover
 BGCI entry

Botanischer Schulgarten Burg
Botanischer Schulgarten Burg
Geography of Hanover
Tourist attractions in Hanover
Buildings and structures in Hanover